Woman at the Wheel is a 1939 German romantic comedy film directed by Paul Martin and starring Lilian Harvey, Willy Fritsch and Leo Slezak. It was the last German film featuring Harvey, who had been the leading box office star in Germany during the 1930s, although she made two further films after moving to France.

Production
The film reunited Harvey and Fritsch who had appeared in several hit films together including The Three from the Filling Station and Congress Dances. It was based on a play by the Hungarian writer Pál Barabás. Harvey was unhappy with the screenplay, which she felt made her character too unsympathetic, but was contractually obliged to appear in the production.

The film's sets were designed by the art director Erich Kettelhut. Location shooting took place in Budapest and Vienna.

Synopsis
A young office worker in Budapest proposes to his colleague, who accepts. However he is fired because all male employees of the company have to be married (and his ceremony took place three days too late). He finds himself unemployed and works as a house husband while his wife is successful at the office and enjoys being the family breadwinner. Feeling emasculated he eventually leaves her and moves back in with his mother. His former boss tries to affect a reconciliation by re-employing him at the company, but he now has to work under his wife which he finds unbearable. The dispute is eventually resolved when she announces that she is pregnant and will be leaving work to care for their expanding family.

Main cast
 Lilian Harvey as Maria Kelemen
 Willy Fritsch as Paul Banky
 Leo Slezak as Generaldirektor
 Grethe Weiser as Anni Bertok
 Georg Alexander as Direktor Bordon
 Rudolf Platte as Pauls Freund
 Hans Junkermann as Diener des Generaldirektors
 Lotte Spira as Marias Mutter

References

Bibliography

External links

1939 films
German romantic comedy films
1939 romantic comedy films
1930s German-language films
Films directed by Paul Martin
Films set in Budapest
Films of Nazi Germany
German films based on plays
UFA GmbH films
German black-and-white films
1930s German films